The 2001 Australian Formula Ford Championship was a CAMS sanctioned motor racing title open to Formula Ford cars. Promoted as the Ford Racing Australian Formula Ford Championship, it was the 32nd national series for Formula Fords to be held in Australia and the ninth to carry the Australian Formula Ford Championship name.
The championship was won by Will Davison.

Calendar
The championship was contested over an eight-round series with two races per round.

Points system
Championship points were awarded on a 20–16–14–12–10–8–6–4–2–1 basis for the first ten positions in each race.
One additional point was awarded for pole position at each round.

Championship results

Race two of the final round was abandoned due to bad weather.

References

External links
Media release archive
Race images at www.willdavison.com.au

Australian Formula Ford Championship seasons
Formula Ford